Albert LeRoy Osborn (September 9, 1858 – April 19, 1940) was a member of the Wisconsin State Assembly.

Biography
Osborn was born on September 9, 1858, in Iola, Wisconsin. His father was a Waupaca County, Wisconsin judge. Osborn graduated from high school in Oshkosh, Wisconsin, before moving to Hurley, Wisconsin. He also served in the Wisconsin Army National Guard. In 1900, Osborn married Alice L. Wyckoff. They had two children. Osborn died at the Mayo Clinic in Rochester, Minnesota, on April 19, 1940.

Political career
Osborn was a member of the Assembly in 1903. He was a Republican.

References

External links

The Political Graveyard

People from Iola, Wisconsin
Politicians from Oshkosh, Wisconsin
People from Hurley, Wisconsin
Republican Party members of the Wisconsin State Assembly
Military personnel from Wisconsin
Wisconsin National Guard personnel
United States Army soldiers
1858 births
1940 deaths